James Wilford Garner (November 22, 1871, Pike County, Mississippi – December 9, 1938) was an American professor of political science.

Biography
He graduated from the Mississippi Agricultural and Mechanical College in 1892 and studied at the University of Chicago (Ph.M., 1900) and at Columbia University (Ph.D., 1902), where he was a member of the Dunning School. His dissertation, Reconstruction in Mississippi, though critical of Reconstruction, was regarded by W. E. B. Du Bois as the fairest of the works of the Dunning School.

He was professor of political science at the University of Pennsylvania in 1902–1903 and professor of political science at the University of Illinois, and he was editor in chief of the American Journal of Criminal Law and Criminology (1910–1911).

He edited Essays on Southern History and Politics (1914). He was Hyde lecturer in the French universities (1921) and Tagore lecturer in the University of Calcutta (1922).

Works

 Reconstruction in Mississippi (1901)
 The History of the United States, with Henry Cabot Lodge (four volumes, 1906)
 Introduction to Political Science (1910)
 Government in the United States, National, State, and Local (1911)
 Civil Government for Indian Students (1920)
 Idées et Institutions Politiques Américaines (1921)
 International Law and the World War (1920)
 Prize Law During the World War (1927)
'' political science and government;(1928)

Notes

Further reading

External links
 
 

1871 births
1938 deaths
American historians
American legal writers
American political scientists
American political writers
American male non-fiction writers
Columbia University alumni
Dunning School
People from Pike County, Mississippi
University of Pennsylvania faculty